The Scandinavian–Mediterranean Corridor, shortened as Scan–Med Corridor and known also as Helsinki–Valletta Corridor, is the number 5 of the ten priority axes of the Trans-European Transport Network.

Description
The Scan–Med Corridor is the longest of the nine TEN-T Core Network Corridors, it develops its network from the Seine to the Danube on the following three axes and through the following European cities (see route in magenta on the official TEN-T map published on the European Union website visible below in the note).

 Helsinki – Turku – Stockholm – Malmö – København – Fehmarn – Hamburg – Hannover
 Bremen – Hannover – Kassel  – Würzburg  – Nürnberg – München – Innsbruck – Brenner – Bozen (Bolzano)  – Trento – Verona – Bologna – Rome – Naples – Bari
 Naples – Strait of Messina Bridge  – Palermo – Valletta

Latest news
On 18 May 2021 the European Commission in an answer to a written question from a parliamentarian, confirmed that the Messina Bridge (the connection between Sicily and the Italian mainland) is of fundamental importance to the objective of the Green Deal since it guarantees connectivity and accessibility of all European regions is at the heart of the TEN-T policy. However, it is up to the Italian State to contract out the work, for which some EU programs could contribute under the 2021-2027 multiannual financial framework.

See also
 Berlin–Palermo railway axis
 Strait of Messina Bridge

Notes

References

External links
 Scandinavian–Mediterranean Corridor
 Trans-European Transport Network (TEN-T) at European Union official web site

Transport and the European Union
TEN-T Core Network Corridors
Strait of Messina Bridge